Gil Bailey (11 January 1936 – 13 April 2020) was a Jamaican-American radio broadcaster, known as the "Godfather of Caribbean Radio" or "Godfather of Reggae Radio". Bailey died on 13 April 2020, from COVID-19.

Life
Bailey was born in the Airy Castle village in Jamaica's St. Thomas Parish in 1936. In 1957, at the age of 21, he moved to London, where he gained employment as MC at Count Suckle's Cue Club. In 1967 Bailey relocated to New York where he married Pat Bailey. Pat and Gil started broadcasting in 1969, leasing time on WHBI in Newark.

References

Radio personalities from New York City
1937 births
2020 deaths
Deaths from the COVID-19 pandemic in New York (state)
American broadcasters
Jamaican radio producers
Jamaican radio presenters
Afro-Jamaican
People from Saint Thomas Parish, Jamaica
British emigrants to the United States
Migrants from British Jamaica to the United Kingdom